For the Winter Olympics, there are 26 venues that have been or will be used for ski jumping. From 1924 to 1956, the construction point or K-point of the ski jumping hill was not fixed by the International Ski Federation.

The first ski jump distance that was standardized was at the 1960 games though it was not measured at the K-point, but at the P-point, which is the landing area of the hill size part of the ski jump area. The two hills used would not be combined into one single venue until the 1980 Games. By the 1992 Games, the hills were being referred to by the K-point rather than their P-Point which meant the normal hill P-Point of  had a K-point of  while the large hill P-point of  had a K-point of  This standard remained until the 2002 Games when the hills were then by their size (HS) or landing point (L) which is  further than the K-point of a normal hill and  further than the K-point of a large hill. The first Winter Olympics to use the HS designation was at the 2006 Games in Turin.

Two of the hills used in the Olympics, Große Olympiaschanze in Garmisch-Partenkirchen for 1936, and Bergiselschanze for the 1964 and 1976 large hill events, have served as hosts for the Four Hills Tournament since the tournament's inception in 1953. Forty-four years later, the Nordic Tournament was created and it involves the 1952 venue at Holmenkollbakken in Oslo's Holmenkollen National Arena and has at times involved the 1994 venue at Lysgårdsbakken in Lillehammer, both in Norway.

List

References

Venues
 
Ski jumping
Olympic venues